Florida held an election for president of the United States on November 3, 1992. The race was extremely close – so close in fact that some news networks mistakenly reported that Democratic challenger Bill Clinton had won in the state, although incumbent President George H. W. Bush was eventually declared the winner. Bush received 40.89% of the vote to Clinton's 39.00%. The final result in Florida reflected the reluctance of many Southern states to back fellow Southerner Clinton, although Clinton was polling well in other parts of the country.

Bush won by about 100,000 votes, marking the first time Florida had backed the losing candidate since 1960, when it voted for Richard Nixon over John F. Kennedy. This was also the last time until the 2020 election that Florida would back the loser of the presidential election as well only the second time since 1924. Despite Bush's narrow victory, this election marked the start of Florida's transition from a strong GOP state into a closely divided swing state for future presidential elections; just four years earlier Bush had carried Florida by 22 points, making it his second-best state in the South. This is also the only election since 1944 that Florida did not vote the same way as Ohio, a state with a similar voting history. Florida was one of 5 states that gave Perot more than 1 million votes, including California, Texas, New York, and Ohio. 

Clinton flipped the heavily populated South Florida counties of Palm Beach, Broward, and Miami-Dade, which had all voted for Bush in 1988, into the Democratic column, and they have remained reliable Democratic bastions in the state ever since, buoying Democratic base support in the state. Clinton's victory in Palm Beach County was noteworthy in as much as that county had not previously backed a Democratic presidential nominee since Florida's "Solid South" days when Franklin D. Roosevelt swept all sixty-seven counties in 1944. This was the last time St. Lucie County voted for a Republican presidential candidate until 2016. As of 2023, this is the last time that Florida has voted to the right of Montana, Kentucky, and Tennessee in a presidential election.

Results

Results by county

Note

References

Florida
1992
1992 Florida elections